Edinburgh is home to a wide variety of music venues for a small European capital.

Permanent venues ranked by capacity 

 Edinburgh Playhouse – 3,059 seated
 Edinburgh Corn Exchange – 3,000 for concerts
 Usher Hall, Edinburgh – 2,200 seated, 2,900 with standing, 1,970 cabaret
 Ross Bandstand, Princess Street Gardens - 2,500 seated
 Edinburgh Festival Theatre – 1,915 seated
 Leith Theatre, Edinburgh – 1,500 seated
 King's Theatre, Edinburgh – 1,300 seated

Temporary music venues ranked 

 Murrayfield Stadium, Edinburgh – 67,144 seated
 Easter Road, Edinburgh – 20,421 seated
 Tynecastle Park, Edinburgh – 20,099 seated
 Edinburgh Castle Bandstand (Royal Edinburgh Military Tattoo) - 8,800 seated

All venues ranked 

 Murrayfield Stadium, Edinburgh – 67,144 seated
 Easter Road, Edinburgh - 20,421 seated
 Tynecastle Park, Edinburgh – 20,099 seated
 Edinburgh Castle Bandstand (Royal Edinburgh Military Tattoo) - 8,800 seated
 Edinburgh Playhouse – 3,059 seated
 Edinburgh Corn Exchange – 3,000 for concerts
 Usher Hall, Edinburgh – 2,200 seated, 2,900 with standing, 1,970 cabaret
 Ross Bandstand, Princess Street Gardens - 2,500 seated
 Edinburgh Festival Theatre – 1,915 seated
 Leith Theatre, Edinburgh – 1,500 seated
 King's Theatre, Edinburgh – 1,300 seated

References 

Edinburgh
Music venues